Einaudi is an Italian surname. Notable people with the surname include:

 Luigi Einaudi (1874–1961), Italian politician
 Mario Einaudi (1904–1994), Italian political scientist, son of Luigi
 Giulio Einaudi (1912–1999), Italian publisher, son of Luigi
 Giulio Einaudi (prelate) (1928–2017), Italian Roman Catholic archbishop and diplomat, Apostolic Nuncio
 Luigi R. Einaudi (born 1936), American diplomat
 Ludovico Einaudi (born 1955), Italian pianist and composer, son of the publisher Giulio

See also
 Einaudi Institute for Economics and Finance, in Rome
 Giulio Einaudi editore, a publishing house founded by Giulio, now an imprint of Arnoldo Mondadori Editore
 Reinaudi (disambiguation)

Italian-language surnames